Zhu Yonggang (born 11 June 2002) is a Chinese para-snowboarder who competes in the SB-UL category.

Career
He represented China at the 2022 Winter Paralympics and won two bronze medals in the snowboard cross and banked slalom events.

References 

2002 births
Living people
Chinese male snowboarders
Paralympic snowboarders of China
Snowboarders at the 2022 Winter Paralympics
Medalists at the 2022 Winter Paralympics
Paralympic medalists in snowboarding
Paralympic bronze medalists for China